MutualArt.com is an art information website that provides auction prices, personalized updates and data on a number of artists. MutualArt.com  also includes an online art appraisals service. Premium Members have access to the site's Art Market Analysis.

History
MutualArt was founded in 2004 by Moti Shniberg, an Israeli-born technology entrepreneur; David A. Ross, a former director of the Whitney Museum; and Dan Galai, a professor of business at Hebrew University. 

MutualArt acted initially as a holding company for the Artist Pension Trust. The company's CEO is Zohar  Elhanani. 

In 2008 MutualArt launched its online portal, mutualart.com. At the time, its web site was reportedly one of the first examples of the Web 2.0 Semantic Web applied to a customer service. The site attempted to link art collectors with artists, museums, galleries and information sources including the art publications, auction house information and prices.

In 2016 the company merged with the Artist Pension Trust to form the MutualArt Group.

References

External links
 
 
 
 
 

Art websites
Internet properties established in 2008